Lê Nhân Đạt, pen name Lê Đạt (September 9, 1929 – April 21, 2008) was a Vietnamese poet. He was one of the poets associated with the Nhân Văn-Giai Phẩm movement. As one of the longest-lived Nhân Văn poets Đạt's influence has been felt more strongly in his continued writings.

References

Vietnamese male poets
1929 births
2008 deaths
Nhân Văn–Giai Phẩm affair
20th-century Vietnamese poets
20th-century male writers